Jakob Miller (also spelled Jacob Myller or Müller; 1550 - 11 December 1597) was a Catholic reformist theologian, provost and administrator of the diocese of Regensburg.

Life 
Miller was born in Kißlegg, Allgäu.  He studied at the Germanicum in Rome and in 1578 was made a cathedral-preacher in Konstanz, then on his deposition from that post in 1585 as visitor to the bishopric of Konstanz. From 1586 he was spiritual overseer of the diocese of Regensburg. In Regensburg Miller tried to set up a Jesuit college, wrote new diocesan constitutions and enforced the decisions of the Council of Trent in the diocese. In 1592 he was made the first mitred provost of Regensburg, since the bishop Philipp of Bavaria was still in his minority.  He died in Regensburg, aged about 47.

Moritz von Ilberg wrote:

Miller's extensive literary works include Ornatus ecclesiasticus: hoc est: compendium praecipuarum rerum, quibus quaevis rite decenterque compositae exornari … (Verlag Berg, München 1591), written in German and Latin and describing church furniture.

References

Bibliography 
  Miller, Jakob. In: Neue Deutsche Biographie (NDB). Band 17. Duncker & Humblot, Berlin 1994, S. 521 f.
  Karl Hausberger, Das Bistum Regensburg. Seine Geschichte, Regensburg 2004, 109.
  Karl Hausberger, Geschichte des Bistums Regensburg, Bd. 1: Mittelalter und frühe Neuzeit, Regensburg 1989, 326f.

External links 

  (Irmgard Wilhelm-Schaffer)

1550 births
1597 deaths
People from Ravensburg (district)
16th-century German Catholic theologians
German male non-fiction writers
16th-century German male writers